Ganjabad-e Do (also Romanized as Ganjābād-e Do; also known as Ganjābād, Ganjābād-e Kahnūj, Ganjābād-e Pā’īn, and Ganj Abad Kahnooj) is a village in Sorkh Qaleh Rural District, in the Central District of Qaleh Ganj County, Kerman Province, Iran. At the 2006 census, its population was 475, in 102 families.

References 

Populated places in Qaleh Ganj County